Mohamed Haniched (born 30 April 1968) is an Algerian footballer. He played in 18 matches for the Algeria national football team from 1993 to 1997. He was also named in Algeria's squad for the 1996 African Cup of Nations tournament.

He has later been a goalkeeper coach and manager.

References

External links
 

1968 births
Living people
People from Blida
Algerian footballers
US Chaouia players
USM Blida players
Algeria international footballers
1996 African Cup of Nations players
Association football goalkeepers
USM El Harrach managers
Association football goalkeeping coaches
21st-century Algerian people